William Picken may refer to:

Billy Picken (1956–2022), Australian rules footballer
Bill Picken (born 1950), Australian horse racing executive
William Picken Alexander (1905–1993), Scottish educator and administrator
William Picken Carr, politician in colonial Victoria, Australia

See also 
William Pickens